North Burleigh is a coastal town in the City of Gold Coast, Queensland, Australia. It is located within the suburb of Miami.

History 
Surveyor Charles Daniel Dunne surveyed the Town of North Burleigh on 10 September 1889. Forty town lots were offered for sale on 24 December 1889.

References

External links 
 Town map of North Burleigh, 1984

Suburbs of the Gold Coast, Queensland
Towns in Queensland
Coastline of Queensland